The 1999–2000 Maltese Premier League (known as the Rothmans Premier League for sponsorship reasons) was the 20th season of the Maltese Premier League, and the 85th season of top-tier football in Malta. It was contested by 10 teams, and Birkirkara F.C. won the championship.

Teams 

The following teams were promoted from the First Division at the start of the season:
 Gozo
 Żurrieq

From the previous Premier League season, the following teams were relegated to the First Division:
 St. Patrick
 Ħamrun Spartans

First phase

League table

Results

Second phase

Top Six 

The teams placed in the first six positions in the league table qualified for the Top Six, and the points obtained during the first phase were halved (and rounded up) before the start of second phase. As a result, the teams started with the following points before the second phase: Birkirkara 24 points, Valletta 20, Floriana 17, Sliema Wanderers 17, Pietà Hotspurs 13 and Hibernians 11.

Play-out 

The teams which finished in the last four league positions were placed in the play-out and at the end of the phase the two lowest-placed teams were relegated to the First Division. The points obtained during the first phase were halved (and rounded up) before the start of second phase. As a result, the teams started with the following points before the second phase: Naxxar Lions 8 points, Gozo 7, Zurrieq 6, Rabat Ajax 5.

Season statistics

Top scorers

References

External links 
 Official website

Maltese Premier League seasons
Malta
1999–2000 in Maltese football